Sangmorkie Tetteh is a Ghanaian media personality. She was the Deputy News Editor at TV Africa and also hosted the station's major English bulletin – News Hour until she resigned. Sangmorkie has worked with other media houses including Ghana Broadcasting Corporation (GBC), Choice FM, TV3, GHOne and TV Africa.

Education 
Sangmorkie had her secondary education at the Mfantsiman Girls Senior High School after staying home for four years after basic school.   She graduated with a Bachelor of Arts in communications, majoring in development communication from the African University College of Communications (AUCC) and later attained the Bachelor of Laws from Central University. In 2020, she attained a master's degree in international relations and diplomacy from the Ghana Institute of Management and Public Administration(GIMPA).

Career 
She is a media consultant in broadcast journalism in TV, radio and print. She is a gender advocate and works within the policy and research sectors. She has thirteen years experience in journalism and  has worked with GBC, Choice FM, TV3, GHOne TV and TV Africa.

Legacy 
She was claimed to have introduced Kase3 Hyew and News Beat which are the mid-morning and the mid-afternoon news bulletins during her time at TV Africa as a Deputy News Editor.

References 

Ghanaian chief executives
Living people
Ghanaian radio presenters
Ghanaian women radio presenters
Ghanaian television presenters
Ghanaian women television presenters
Ghanaian journalists
Ghanaian women journalists
Year of birth missing (living people)
Ghanaian business executives